Vic Harding (5 July 1952 in East Ham, London – 8 June 1979 Whipps Cross, London) was a motorcycle speedway rider.

Career
Harding began at the Rye House training school in 1970 run by Len Silver and spent several seasons trying to break into a league team.

In 1974 the Sunderland Gladiators handed him the chance. In 1975 he moved to Weymouth Wizards.

In 1977 Len Silver signed him for the Hackney Hawks from Weymouth and spent most of that season as reserve. In 1978 he began improving so much that by 1979 he was a heat leader.

Death
Tragedy struck on 8 June 1979 when Harding was killed whilst riding for Hackney at Hackney Wick Stadium, Waterden Road. He was in a heat as a replacement for Bo Petersen but during the race he was involved in a terrible crash with Steve Weatherley. Harding was killed and Weatherley was left with a broken back and paraplegia. 

Following this tragic accident, the Hawks hosted a Vic Harding Memorial Trophy every season in Harding's honour. It was in fact the last ever meeting hosted by the Hackney Hawks.

References

External links
 Hackney Hawks Website
 http://hackneyreunion.com/

1952 births
1979 deaths
British speedway riders
English motorcycle racers
Motorcycle racers who died while racing
Hackney Hawks riders
Hull Vikings riders
Sunderland Stars riders
Exeter Falcons riders
Weymouth Wildcats riders
Poole Pirates riders
Leicester Lions riders
Crayford Kestrels riders
Sport deaths in England